Bishops of Katowice archdiocese.

People from Katowice
Katowice